Jules Reimerink (born 30 September 1989) is a Dutch footballer who plays for Oberliga Niedersachsen club TuS Bersenbrück. He is a two-footed player and plays as a winger, but can also play as a striker.

Club career

Twente
Born in Oldenzaal, Overijssel, Reimerink began his youth career at hometown team, the amateurs of Quick '20. Because of his great displays for the youth team, he was picked up by top-tier side FC Twente. Between 2001 and 2007, he played for the youth team, joining the reserves in summer 2007. He became top goalscorer of Twente's reserves and also won the cup with the second squad. He was rewarded with a new four-year contract, which he signed, keeping him in Enschede until 2011. It was also announced that he would join Go Ahead Eagles on loan for the next one-and-a-half season.

Go Ahead Eagles (loan)
On 18 January 2009, Reimerink made his Eerste Divisie debut for the Eagles. He was positioned as right striker in the starting lineup. Go Ahead Eagles, however, were defeated 0–1 by Zwolle through a goal scored by Derk Boerrigter. After having played six matches – five matches in the starting lineup, one as a substitute – he suffered a fracture in his left ankle. This meant that Reimerink was ruled out for four to six weeks In the 2009–10 season, Reimerink stayed on loan at Go Ahead Eagles. This resulted in a strong season for Reimerink, scoring four goals and being chosen as one of the top talents of the Eerste Divisie.

Energie Cottbus
In 2010, he signed a four-year contract with German club FC Energie Cottbus. In his first year under head coach Claus-Dieter Wollitz, he performed well. After making less appearances in the 2011–12 season under Wollitz's successor Rudi Bommer, his contract, which was still running for two years, was terminated.

Return to the Netherlands
On 12 July 2012, Reimerink signed a three-year deal with VVV-Venlo. On 19 June 2014, Reimerink signed a one-year deal with his former team Go Ahead Eagles, achieving promotion to the Dutch Eredivisie in his first season there.

Return to Germany
Although Reimerink had also received offers from more prominent clubs, he moved – also for private reasons – to the fourth-tier Regionalliga West club FC Viktoria Köln ahead of the 2015–16 season. After the season he left the club.

Reimerink had expressed a wish to play in the 3. Liga, and in June 2016, VfL Osnabrück signed him. He received a two-year contract. After two seasons of playing regularly, Reimerink moved to Sportfreunde Lotte on a free transfer, signing a two-year contract on 22 June 2018.

Later career
After having played in Germany for some years, Reimerink returned to his first youth club Quick '20 from the 2020–21 season, competing in the Derde Divisie.

On 21 March 2021, Reimerink signed with Oberliga Niedersachsen club TuS Bersenbrück.

References

External links
 Voetbal International profile 
 
 Jules Reimerink at Kicker

1989 births
Living people
People from Oldenzaal
Association football wingers
Dutch footballers
Dutch expatriate footballers
Quick '20 players
FC Twente players
Go Ahead Eagles players
VVV-Venlo players
Eerste Divisie players
Eredivisie players
FC Energie Cottbus players
FC Viktoria Köln players
VfL Osnabrück players
Sportfreunde Lotte players
2. Bundesliga players
3. Liga players
Regionalliga players
Vierde Divisie players
Oberliga (football) players
Dutch expatriate sportspeople in Germany
Expatriate footballers in Germany
Netherlands youth international footballers
Footballers from Overijssel